Kamlesh Makvana (born 31 August 1983) is a former cricketer  who has played domestic cricket for Saurashtra. Makvana is an allrounder - a right hand batsman and offbreak bowler. He has also played for West Zone cricket team. He was the first bowler for Saurashtra to take 200 wickets in the Ranji Trophy.

References

External links

Indian cricketers
Living people
1983 births
Saurashtra cricketers
West Zone cricketers